Michael Cresap House is a historic home in Oldtown, Allegany County, Maryland, USA. It is a -story, two-part stone and brick house built about 1764. The house is associated with Captain Michael Cresap (1742–1775), a well known Ohio frontiersman.

References

External links
, including undated photo, at Maryland Historical Trust
The Irvin Allen/Michael Cresap Museum in Oldtown

Historic house museums in Maryland
Houses on the National Register of Historic Places in Maryland
Houses in Allegany County, Maryland
Houses completed in 1764
Museums in Allegany County, Maryland
1764 establishments in Maryland
National Register of Historic Places in Allegany County, Maryland